Gray hole may refer to:
 a form of exotic star
 Q-star, SUSY Q-ball stars and B-ball stars
 exotic versions of neutron stars
 a form of packet drop attack